Bans is a village located in Sataon block of Rae Bareli district, Uttar Pradesh, India. As of 2011, its population is 1,341, in 244 households. It has two primary schools and no healthcare facilities.

The 1961 census recorded Bans as comprising 3 hamlets, with a total population of 615 people (282 male and 333 female), in 113 households and 103 physical houses. The area of the village was given as 579 acres.

The 1981 census recorded Bans as having a population of 796 people, in 157 households, and having an area of 234.73 hectares. The main staple foods were given as wheat and rice.

References

Villages in Raebareli district